Evgeny Saidullin (born 14 December 2000) is an international speedway rider from Russia.

Speedway career 
Saidullin won a gold medal at the 2020 Speedway of Nations despite being unused as the reserve rider for Emil Sayfutdinov and Artem Laguta. In 2021, he competed as reserve rider in the 2021 Speedway Grand Prix.

He also competes in Ice Speedway.

References 

Living people
2000 births
Russian speedway riders